Kristýna Plíšková and Alison Van Uytvanck were the defending champions, but both players chose not to participate.

Usue Maitane Arconada and Sofia Kenin won the title, defeating Tammi Patterson and Chanel Simmonds in the final, 4–6, 6–1, [10–5].

Seeds

Draw

References
Main Draw

Stockton Challenger - Doubles